Castello De Sanctis (Italian for De Sanctis Castle)  is a  Middle Ages castle in Roccacasale, Province of L'Aquila (Abruzzo).

History

Architecture

References

External links

De Sanctis
Roccacasale